The legal thriller genre is a type of crime fiction genre that focuses on the proceedings of the investigation, with particular reference to the impacts on courtroom proceedings and the lives of characters.

The courtroom proceedings and legal authorship are ubiquitous characteristics of the legal thriller genre  In the genre, lawyers as legal professionals are featured as the supreme hero. Their actions in the courtroom affect the quality of character's lives, as they determine innocence prevailing against injustice.

Many legal professionals such as judges and lawyers constitute the primary authorship of the genre, providing their own relevant experiences  The legal authorship experience is certified through the novel, Presumed Innocent written by the lawyer and author, Scott Turow. American writers such as Harper Lee experienced her father's dealings as a lawyer.

The author, John Grisham as a lawyer also contributes to the development of the legal thriller genre. Legal language is also another characteristic of the legal thriller. The television shows, Suits and How to Get Away with Murder embody the legal thriller, characterised by legal language. Novels and television shows of the legal thriller genre have impacted education. Many address complex social justice issues such as racial discrimination and the death penalty.

Television

In Australia, Denmark, and Poland, 62% of law and justice shows were imported from the United States”. Legal thriller television is mostly sourced from the American jurisdiction.

As American shows dominate the legal thriller genre, the characteristic of legal language has emerged. In the American legal drama, Suits, the character, Harvey mentions the term, “subpoena” consistently.  The legal language, commonly French and Latin expressions is central to courtroom proceedings in legal thriller television. There is also other legal language used in the show including terminology such as “affidavit”, “plaintiff”, “defendant”, “malfeasance” and “in lieu”.

How To Get Away with Murder is an American television series, categorised in the genre of legal thriller.  In the courtroom proceedings of Episode 1: Pilot found within the List of How to Get Away with Murder episodes, legal language such as the term, “mens rea” is utilised. The television series features a legal professional as the leading teacher and a group of law students who devise tactics to combat a range of criminal cases and murder mysteries.  There is a difficulty for characters to balance personal life and professional success as women, people of color and marginalised individuals in legal thriller television shows.

Other legal thriller television in America also consisted of the show The Defenders (1961 TV series). Social justice themes were prevalent within this show and police procedural elements in subsequent shows such as Arrest and Trial. The development of these television shows led to the famous 1990's T.V show creation, Law & Order. There were different categories of legal thriller shows also developed such as courtroom drama, ensemble shows and police, detective dramas. The characters in these shows displayed ardent personality traits when investigating and dealing with complex legal issues of the justice system.

Australian legal thriller shows developed in the 1980s and 1990s are classed into categories of adjudication and punishment The television shows concerning adjudication and punishment consist of the soap opera, Carson's Law and SeaChange. Both shows feature female lawyers who experience prejudice from males in their legal careers.

There are thematic ideas of justice and equality associated with the female lawyer protagonist's fight for change to break the glass ceiling. The inequality of men and women prevalent in the set time of the 1920s contribute to these themes present. In 2014, Australian legal thrillers developed were limited, compared to previous years that are tabulated with “45%”.

In Britain, the most dominant form of legal thriller show is in the category of police and detective shows. Examples of these include the Dixon of Dock Green and The Sweeney. Women also played a role in these television shows as evident in Juliet Bravo and C.A.T.S. Eyes. Courtroom drama in Britain featured the series Justice (1971 TV series) as a prominent show, where the courtroom drama played a big role in its characteristic of the legal thriller. As Britain has three legal systems, this distinction was made apparent in the television shows, also highlighting barristers and advocates in wigs as part of the show.

Books

Books of the legal thriller genre include the memoir, Just Mercy (book) by Bryan Stevenson and the novel, To Kill A Mockingbird by Harper Lee.

Major authors

Major authors of this genre include the following: 
 Bryan Stevenson 
 Harper Lee
 Scott Turow
 John Grisham
 Michael Connelly
 Linda Fairstein 
 Paul Levine
 Patrick Hoffman
 Vish Dhamija
 Jilliane Hoffman
 Mark Gimenez
 Marcia Clark
 James Grippando

Films

Legal thriller films provide introspection into the life of a lawyer and legal professionals. 
Within films, the central character is often engaged in professional work and experiences an obstacle that they have to overcome such as a client's case. The character confronts problems with their personal life and work, as it is under threat by the complex case, creating a series of action and courtroom battles.

The problems that characters faced are evident within reviews of films such as The Judge, where family dynamics are strained after a lawyer returns home for his mother's funeral. Reviews from the New York Times comment on the film's transformation into a crime story, characteristic of the legal thriller. The film itself unfolds the legal thriller's ideal courtroom drama style and the film is taken place in what is deemed as a "nostalgia-tinged town". Further films such as The Lincoln Lawyer have also met similar reviews from Roger Ebert, commenting on the love of three elements in the film: courtroom scene, old cars and tangled criminals. The 2019 film, Dark Waters raises an ethical dilemma of lawyers often choosing sides within films, as the defence lawyer has to switch sides to defend a poisoned community. He risks his own future, community and life through dealing with the case, characteristic of the legal thriller.

By combining the elements of film and law together, the relationship becomes central to the audience. It is through film techniques, images, symbols and social functions that legal thriller films can make an impact on the audience. The film Mangrove shows the inequalities and injustices prevalent through Britain's Caribbean history. Steve McQueen was the first black director of an Academy winning best picture with 12 Years a Slave. The five-part anthology, featuring Mangrove as the first visualises courtroom drama and heroism, characterising the legal thriller genre. McQueen made his film resemble a landmark of the civil rights trial against black activists. The film uses the characteristics of the legal thriller genre through a powerhouse courtroom drama and focusing on racial justice. The power divide between two opposing sides is intended to shape transformative victory, as audiences can learn about diversity.

A Fall from Grace also features the challenge often taken by lawyers in legal thriller films. For example, a young public defender has to handle the challenging case of a woman charged with murdering her husband. The film features elements of a conventional courtroom drama such as the heroic lawyer, shady characters and a law firm setting. Within the film, there are plot twists, characteristic of the legal thriller genre. Furthermore, the film Law has ample court scenes and features a character taking on the fight for justice. The film defies the stereotypical expectations of women through featuring the main character as a woman who wants to speak openly about gang rape victimisation.

The recognition of injustice is another emerging aspect of legal thriller films. Marshall is another example of a legal thriller film, where the lawyer is feature as the main character, travelling the country on behalf of the NAACP to defend black men who are accused of crimes.  The film features a courtroom scene where violence occurs in retrieving the confession of a client and the difficulty to obtain the truth. Flashbacks are used as a key film technique to craft outrage as revealed by a film review. The courtroom scenes are considered suspenseful and the setting of the 1940s shows a stage where people threw a facade with fake costumes and bright lights. Racism is exposed as a key social justice issue explored where the truth demands a voice.

The following table summarises films that are categorised in the legal thriller genre:

Impact of genre
The legal thriller genre has impacted culture, schools, and universities. As an example, the novel, To Kill A Mockingbird is acclaimed for inspiring American culture. Harper Lee has provided a new understanding of the Southern women voice, as Eichelberger, Professor of Southern Literature at the College of Charleston stated people “didn’t really understand the South and looked down upon it…”  

In addition, the novel as a legal thriller worldwide sale topped 40 million and won numerous prizes such as the Pulitzer Prize. The novel also translated into a film, receiving nominations in various categories such as best actress, music and cinematography and won the 1963 Oscars. It has impacted schools through becoming a part of the syllabus reading list for learning, as it addresses timeless concepts of racism and social injustice, relevant to America.

Scott Turow's novel, Presumed Innocent was an explosive bestseller in 1987. His story introduced the sub-genre of the legal thriller through incorporating aspects of the criminal trial process. The core inspiration of Turow's work is the examination of a witness during a trial, the story stemming from the lawyer's own experiences.

Legal thriller books instigate the need for equality. The National Public Radio provides coverage of the legal thriller memoir, Just Mercy (book). Brian Stevenson provides insight into shaping the need for equality within America, as there has been a hundred years of supremacism and violence against black people in America.

The film, Just Mercy raises the themes of equality and justice for the racial injustice against black African Americans in the United States of America. It has introduced the social issue of the death penalty, as American people disapproved of it after watching the film. The legal thriller enlightens hope that complex social issues such as the death penalty have the potential to change. 
 
Suits, as a legal thriller has shaped “interpersonal loyalty” wrecked by American pursuits of power and wealth.  There is progressive impact  on depicting race and gender equality, as they made the head an African American woman  and use female lawyers.

The television show, How to Get Away with Murder depicts the complexities of race and the LGBTQ community. Characters in the series such as the African American lawyer, Annalise Keating, played by the actor, Viola Davis represents racial diversity. The character, Oliver Hampton, (Conrad Ricamora) advocates for the marginalised members in the LGBTQ community.

The film, Marshall was based on the history of a lawyer named Marshall who created the NAACP Legal Defence fund. He was devoted to identifying cases that would change history.  The film has made a great impact on audiences, as it has a turned a real-life hero to the all-time star of a courtroom drama. This is revealed in a film review, where it states the legal thriller has a created a real-life superhero for audiences to gain inspiration. Furthermore, using the idealistic approach of a young lawyer creates a compelling courtroom drama. The elements of historical racism embedded within the film dates back to the 1950s and has created a riveting, touching tale on audiences.

Throughout the popular culture of legal thriller films, there have been variations in the character representations of lawyers. The character representation of lawyers affect audiences both negatively and positively. The positive impact is the level of heroism performed by lawyers in saving their client's case. Negative representations are associated with the representation of lawyers as villains and distrustful. The representations are reflective of lawyers declining after the American Revolution. As many films, novels and shows are produced within the genre, audiences have the ability to choose the images of the lawyer that they like. The process of revealing these images is through showing the beginning action, the action itself and the consequences of the lawyer's actions.

See also
 Legal thriller novels
 Legal drama

References

Further reading

External links
 10 Best Legal Thrillers That Bring The Courtroom Drama
 15 Must-Read Legal Thrillers
 
 
 20 Best Legal Thrillers of the Last 20 Years
 The best legal thrillers (that aren’t by John Grisham)
 Be Guilty Of Reading The Best Legal Thrillers of 2019
 
 How To Write a Legal Thriller
 Elements of a Legal Thriller
 Law and Literature: Legal Thrillers
 Redefining the Legal "Thriller"
 Brief History of the Legal Thriller
 When Is A Legal Thriller Not a Legal Thriller?

Legal Thriller films
Legal films by genre
Legal television series
Crime fiction
Film genres
Thriller genres
Thrillers